Joseph William Sutherland (22 June 1910 – 17 July 1981) was an Australian rules footballer who played with Footscray, St Kilda and Hawthorn in the Victorian Football League (VFL).
Sutherland had a career that was marred by injuries.

Sutherland was born in Kyneton but recruited from Melbourne club Sunshine. He kicked a career best six goals in the opening round of the 1936 VFL season, against Richmond. In his 12 season career he rarely put together a string of games, with his most productive year being an 11 game effort in that 1936 season. He didn't play senior VFL football in 1931 or 1933. His career ended when he enlisted in the Australian Army to serve in World War II, as he was 34 by the time he was discharged in 1945.

References

1910 births
People from Kyneton
Australian rules footballers from Victoria (Australia)
Western Bulldogs players
St Kilda Football Club players
Hawthorn Football Club players
Australian military personnel of World War II
1981 deaths